Lissanthe sapida, sometimes referred as the native cranberry is a shrub from the family Ericaceae, found near Sydney, Australia. A rare plant, with a ROTAP rating of 3RCa, it grows in dry eucalyptus woodlands and rocky areas, of soils based on sandstone.

It usually grows to about 1 m tall, though it may be seen to 2.5 m. Leaves are narrow oblong, around 15 to 25 mm long, 2 to 4 mm wide, with a sharp point. Leaves have seven or eight ribs on the underside. The native cranberry flowers from March to September, with attractive white, bell-shaped, hanging flowers. The juicy fruit is round, red, and hairless with a flat top.

It may be seen in areas such as Bargo, Blackheath, Mountain Lagoon, and the Nepean Gorge.

This plant first appeared in the scientific literature in 1810, in the Prodromus Florae Novae Hollandiae, authored by the prolific Scottish botanist, Robert Brown.

References

Epacridoideae
Ericales of Australia
Flora of New South Wales
Plants described in 1810